Margison is a surname. Notable people with the surname include:

Emery Hyslop-Margison (born 1957), Canadian professor of education
Richard Margison (born 1953), Canadian operatic tenor

See also
Margeson